Alex Totten (born 12 February 1946) is a Scottish former football player and manager.

Playing career 
Growing up in Dennyloanhead, Stirlingshire, he signed for Liverpool straight from school in 1960 before signing for top division Dundee back in Scotland in 1964. After a season, he moved onto Dunfermline Athletic where he made nearly 30 top division league appearances over four seasons. In 1969, he moved on to Falkirk, racking up another 20 starts over his two seasons at Brockville and also scoring his first Senior goal.

In July 1971 Totten transferred to Dumfries side Queen of the South and became a first team regular for the first time his career in the lower division. The last transfer of his playing days came in July 1973 with a move to Alloa Athletic where he wound down his on-field career and became manager in 1980.

Managerial career 
Three years as a manager for Alloa Athletic ended when he became manager at previous club Falkirk after leading Alloa Athletic to the Scottish First Division and a 6th-place finish. He then moved to Rangers to become Jock Wallace's assistant, expecting to – in time – become manager. However, when Graeme Souness was appointed in 1986, Totten left to manage Dumbarton. He then took St Johnstone from the old Second Division to the Premier Division in the space of three seasons. He also led St Johnstone to Scottish Cup semi-final appearances in 1989 and 1991. Totten's role in St Johnstone's progress was rewarded when he was made SFWA Manager of the Year for 1991, but Geoff Brown sacked Totten in 1992 for demanding too much money for new players.

Totten then managed East Fife and Kilmarnock, before returning to Falkirk as a manager in 1996. He guided Falkirk to the 1997 Scottish Cup Final, having defeated Celtic in the semi-final. Falkirk lost 1–0 to Kilmarnock, who had sacked Totten earlier that season, in the final. Totten was eventually moved into a director of football role by Falkirk in 2002. Falkirk played Rangers in a testimonial match for Totten on 21 July 2007 at the Falkirk Stadium. The match ended 1–1 with Lee McCulloch scoring for Rangers and Pedro Moutinho scoring for Falkirk.

Honours

Manager 
Alloa Athletic
 Stirlingshire Cup : 1981–82
 Scottish Second Division promotion :1981–82

St Johnstone
 Scottish Second Division promotion : 1987–88
 Scottish First Division : 1989–90

Falkirk
 Stirlingshire Cup : 1997–98, 1999–2000
 Scottish Challenge Cup : 1997–98

References 
 Reid, Harry (2005), The Final Whistle?, Birlinn,

Notes 

1946 births
Alloa Athletic F.C. managers
Alloa Athletic F.C. players
Dumbarton F.C. managers
Dundee F.C. players
Dunfermline Athletic F.C. players
East Fife F.C. managers
Falkirk F.C. managers
Falkirk F.C. players
Kilmarnock F.C. managers
Liverpool F.C. players
Living people
Queen of the South F.C. players
Rangers F.C. non-playing staff
Scottish Football League players
Scottish football managers
Scottish footballers
St Johnstone F.C. managers
Footballers from Falkirk (council area)
Scottish Football League managers
Association football defenders